Joan Harrison (20 June 1907 – 14 August 1994) was an English screenwriter and producer. She became the first female screenwriter to be nominated for the Best Original Screenplay Oscar when the category was introduced in 1940, and was the first screenwriter to receive two Academy Award nominations in the same year in separate categories, for co-writing the screenplay for the films Foreign Correspondent (1940) (original) and Rebecca (1940) (adapted), both directed by Alfred Hitchcock, with whom she had a long professional relationship.

Biography

Born in Guildford, Surrey, Harrison was the daughter of a publisher of two local newspapers. She studied at St Hugh's College, Oxford and reviewed films for the student newspaper. She also studied at the Sorbonne. In 1933, she became Alfred Hitchcock's secretary after answering a newspaper advertisement. She began reading books and scripts for him and became one of Hitchcock's most trusted associates. Harrison appears in a scene in Hitchcock's original version of The Man Who Knew Too Much (1934), eating dinner with Peter Lorre's character. Hitchcock developed the habit of taking Harrison to dinner and recounting the details of hundreds of murders; Harrison had developed an interest in criminology. She worked with Hitchcock on other areas of his film's production to his wife Alma Reville. The couple became close to Harrison. She was among the screenwriters for Hitchcock film Jamaica Inn (1939) based on the novel by Daphne du Maurier, her first script.
 
When Hitchcock moved to Hollywood in March 1939 to begin his contract with David O. Selznick to direct films, Harrison emigrated with him as an assistant and writer. She continued contributing to the screenplays for Hitchcock's films Rebecca (1940), another du Maurier adaptation, Foreign Correspondent (1940), Suspicion (1941), and Saboteur (1942).

She became a film producer with Phantom Lady (1944), collaborating with the director Robert Siodmak. She was also credited as one of the screenwriters for Dark Waters (1944) after Phantom Lady star Franchot Tone persuaded her to work on the script as the writer of the original story, Marian Cockrell, was having difficulties with the adaptation. The other films she produced were The Strange Affair of Uncle Harry (1945), Nocturne (1946), Ride the Pink Horse (1947), and They Won't Believe Me (1947). At the time, she was one of only three female producers in Hollywood, the others being Virginia Van Upp and Harriet Parsons. Harrison was an uncredited screenwriter for Ride the Pink Horse (1947) and Your Witness (1950).

Harrison worked in television with Hitchcock together when she produced his TV series Alfred Hitchcock Presents (with Norman Lloyd) and Suspicion. She and Lloyd were later producers on the Hammer TV anthology Journey to the Unknown, which ran for a single season in 1968.

A biography of Harrison by Christina Lane, Phantom Lady: Hollywood Producer Joan Harrison, the Forgotten Woman Behind Hitchcock, was published in 2020.

Personal life
Harrison married thriller novelist Eric Ambler in 1958; the couple remained married until her death in 1994. She and Ambler lived in London for the last 20 years of her life.

Filmography
Jamaica Inn (1939) - writer
Rebecca (1940) - writer
Foreign Correspondent (1940) - writer
Suspicion (1941) - writer
Saboteur (1942) - writer
Phantom Lady (1944) - producer
Dark Waters (1944) - writer
The Strange Affair of Uncle Harry (1945) - producer
Nocturne (1946) - producer, uncredited writer
They Won't Believe Me (1947) - producer
Ride the Pink Horse (1947) - producer, uncredited writer
Once More, My Darling (1949) - producer
Your Witness (1950) - producer, uncredited writer
Circle of Danger (1951) - producer
Schlitz Playhouse (TV series) - episode "Double Exposure" (1952) - writer
Janet Dean, Registered Nurse (1954–55) (TV series) - producer
Alfred Hitchcock Presents (TV series) (1955–62) - producer
Schlitz Playhouse (TV series) - episode "The Travelling Corpse" (1957) - producer
Suspicion (1957–58) (TV series) - producer
Startime (TV series) - episode "Incident at a Corner" (1960) - producer
Alcoa Premiere (TV series) - episode "The Jail" (1962) - producer
The Alfred Hitchcock Hour (TV series) (1962–63) - producer
Journey Into Fear (1966) (TV series) - producer
Journey to the Unknown (1968) (TV series) - producer
Love Hate Love (1971) (TV movie) - producer
The Most Deadly Game (1970–71) (TV series) - producer

Awards and nominations

References

Further reading 
Lane, Christina. Phantom Lady: Hollywood Producer Joan Harrison, the Forgotten Woman Behind Hitchcock. Chicago: Chicago Review Press, 2020. Print.
Lane, Christina. "Stepping Out from Behind the Grand Silhouette: Joan Harrison's Films of the 1940s", Situation and Film, eds. David E. Gerstner and Janet Staiger. New York: Routledge, 2003. 97-116. Print.

External links
 

1907 births
1994 deaths
People from Guildford
Alumni of St Hugh's College, Oxford
British film producers
British television producers
British women television producers
British women screenwriters
20th-century British women writers
20th-century British screenwriters